Organization & Environment (O&E) is a peer-reviewed academic journal that covers the fields of "sustainability management, policy and related social science.” The current editor-in-chief is Michael Russo (University of Oregon). Formerly it was Maurizio Zollo (Bocconi University). The journal was established in 1987 and is published by SAGE Publications; it is sponsored by the Group of Research on Organizations and the Natural Environment (GRONEN).

Abstracting and indexing 
Organization & Environment is abstracted and indexed in Scopus and the Social Sciences Citation Index. In 2017, the journal's impact factor was 5.049.

History 
Under the editorship of founding co-editor John M. Jermier and a number of editors, the journal took an interdisciplinary direction, playing host to a variety of perspectives including critical organization theory and radical ecology. Collaboration between members of the Organization and Natural Environment section of the Academy of Management and the Section on Environment and Technology section of the American Sociological Association was at the heart of the journal's framework. During this period O&E became a prominent outlet for environmental sociology, publishing articles both from established and world-renowned environmental thinkers and younger scholars who would later become leaders in environmental sociology. The journal played an important role in increasing the influence of environmental sociology within the larger discipline and by 2011 its impact factor had grown to rival that of distinguished general interest journals such as Social Problems and Social Forces.

Editors 
The following persons have been (co-)editors of the journal:
 Paul Shrivastava (founding co-editor, Concordia University)
 John M. Jermier (founding co-editor, University of South Florida), 1997-2012
 John Bellamy Foster (University of Oregon), 1996-2001
 Richard York (University of Oregon), 2006-2012
 J. Alberto Aragon-Correa (University of Granada), 2012–2016
 Mark Starik (San Francisco State University), 2012–2016
 Maurizio Zollo (Bocconi University), 2016-2019
 Mike Russo (University of Oregon), 2020-present

Editorial transition 
On December 1, 2012, Alberto Aragon-Correa and Mark Starik became the editors of Organization & Environment. From that point, the journal has been aiming to conduct "rigorous explorations and analyses of the multiple connections between the management of organizations and any of the relevant dimensions of sustainability"; targeted contributors are "sustainability management, policy, and related social science researchers".

Criticism 
The December 2012 editorial transition was strongly criticized by (now former) editorial board members of Organization & Environment as an "editorial coup" on the part of Sage and GRONEN. According to one account, the editorial transition was decided upon and carried out by Sage independently of its editors/editorial board, without their prior knowledge or acceptance. Critics have pointed out that this is not the first time accusations of this sort have been leveled at Sage. In 2009, political scientists charged that the editor of Political Theory was replaced unilaterally and unfairly. In this previous case, Sage was forced to apologize, admitting that "whatever" they had done "was done without consulting the scholars on the editorial board of the journal".

Critics also argue that the pro-corporate/management stance of GRONEN stands in stark contrast to the work of previous O&E editors and writers, many of whom tended strongly to emphasize the role of corporate power in perpetuating environmental degradation. In a statement published in October 2012, 25 members of the editorial board of O&E resigned in protest of the transition.

References

External links 
 
 Group of Research on Organizations and the Natural Environment
 Former editors' website, University of South Florida (through December 2012; does not reflect current editors or journal contact information)

Environmental social science journals
SAGE Publishing academic journals
English-language journals
Environmental sociology
Quarterly journals
Publications established in 1987
Sustainability journals
Business and management journals
Environmental studies journals